Ren Zhongfei (born August 28, 1982, in Harbin, Heilongjiang, China) is a Chinese former pair skater. He competed with Ding Yang. They are the 2005 Chinese national champions. They are the 2002 World Junior bronze medalists and the 2003 World Junior silver medalists. Although they attempted the throw quadruple toe loop in international competition, they never successfully landed it cleanly and it was never ratified.

Results
(with Ding)

External links
 

1982 births
Living people
Chinese male pair skaters
Figure skaters from Harbin
World Junior Figure Skating Championships medalists
Competitors at the 2005 Winter Universiade